The National People's Party (PNP,) is a Christian democratic political party in Curaçao established in 1948. The party participated in island council elections of the territory Curaçao as well as the Curaçao-constituency of the Estates of the Netherlands Antilles until the dissolution of the Netherlands Antilles in 2010.

The party then held seats in the first, second and third Estates of Curaçao, but lost that seat in the 2017 elections. They would obtain their best ever result in the next elections in 2021 for the fifth Estates, winning four seats and over 12% of the votes case.

Netherlands Antilles
The party was founded in 1948 by Moises Frumencio da Costa Gomez, the first Prime Minister of the Netherlands Antilles. Five other minister presidents of the country were affiliated with the PNP. At the legislative elections in the Netherlands Antilles in 2002, 2006 and 2010 respectively, the party won three, two and one of the 14 Curaçao-seats in the 22 seat Estates of the Netherlands Antilles.

In the island council of the island territory Curaçao in 2003 and 2007, the party won two seats. In the last island council the party obtained one of the 21 seats. The island council continued as Estates of Curaçao upon the dissolution of the Netherlands Antilles in October 2010.

Election results

References

Political parties in Curaçao
1948 establishments in Curaçao and Dependencies
Political parties established in 1948